This is a list of the main career statistics of professional Chinese tennis player Peng Shuai.

Performance timelines

Only main-draw results in WTA Tour, Grand Slam tournaments, Fed Cup and Olympic Games are included in win–loss records.

Singles
Current after the 2021 season.

Doubles

Significant finals

Grand Slam tournaments

Doubles: 3 (2 titles, 1 runner-up)

Year-end championships

Doubles: 2 (1 title, 1 runner-up)

Premier Mandatory/Premier 5 tournaments

Doubles: 11 (8 titles, 3 runner-ups)

WTA career finals

Singles: 9 (2 titles, 7 runner-ups)

Doubles: 32 (23 titles, 9 runner-ups)

WTA 125K series finals

Singles: 3 (2 titles, 1 runner–up)

Doubles: 1 (1 title)

ITF Circuit finals

Singles: 16 (12 titles, 4 runner–ups)

Doubles: 6 (3 titles, 3 runner–ups)

Record against other players

Record against top 10 players
Peng's record against players who have been ranked in the top 10. Active players are in boldface.

Wins over top 10 players

References

Peng, Shuai